Sarayköy 1926 FK, formerly Denizli Belediyespor, is a Turkish sports club based in Denizli, Turkey. They play their home matches at Doğan Seyfi Atlı Stadium that has a capacity of 2,000.

External links
 Sarayköy 1926 on TFF.org

TFF Second League
Sport in Denizli
Denizli Belediyespor